Humaid Ahmed (Arabic:حميد أحمد) (born 7 February 1988) is an Emirati footballer. He currently plays as a winger.

External links

References

Emirati footballers
1988 births
Living people
Sharjah FC players
Al-Nasr SC (Dubai) players
Fujairah FC players
Al Jazira Club players
Al Hamriyah Club players
UAE Pro League players
UAE First Division League players
Association football wingers